Sooretama is a municipality located in the Brazilian state of Espírito Santo.

The municipality contains part of the  Sooretama Biological Reserve, a strictly protected conservation unit created in 1982 when two earlier units were merged.

References

Municipalities in Espírito Santo